Events of the year 2023 in Iraq.

Incumbents 
 President: Abdul Latif Rashid
 Prime Minister: Mohammed Shia' Al Sudani

Events 
 19 January - Arabian Gulf Cup stampede, in Basra.
 31 January - Killing of Tiba al-Ali

See also

Country overviews 
 History of Iraq
 History of modern Iraq
 Outline of Iraq
 Government of Iraq
 Politics of Iraq
 Timeline of Iraq history
 Years in Iraq

References 

 
Iraq
Iraq
2020s in Iraq
Years of the 21st century in Iraq